Hexadactilia trilobata is a moth of the family Pterophoridae described by Thomas Bainbrigge Fletcher in 1910. It is found in Australia in Queensland and New Guinea.

Original description

External links
Australian Faunal Directory
Trin Wiki

Moths of Australia
Deuterocopinae
Moths of New Guinea
Moths described in 1910